Jeffrey D. Sams is an actor known primarily for his television work.

Sams has been a main cast member of several television series, few of which have made it past their first season. These include Medicine Ball, Sleepwalkers, Rob Thomas's Cupid, Wasteland, and Line of Fire.

Sams has had recurring roles on television series such as Strong Medicine, Law & Order, and CSI. He appeared on Broadway in the 1992 musical Five Guys Named Moe, the 1993 motion picture Fly By Night, and in the 1997 motion picture Soul Food.

As of 2005, Sams had a recurring role on Rob Thomas's Veronica Mars as a baseball player named Terrence Cook. His Cupid co-star Paula Marshall previously had a recurring role on the show, and Thomas has stated that - at some point - he would like to reunite Marshall, Sams, and their Cupid co-star Jeremy Piven on Veronica Mars.

Sams also appeared in the Netflix film Reality High.  Sams appeared as Adam Clayborne in the 1997 Hallmark Hall of Fame Collection movie Rose Hill starring Jennifer Garner as Mary Rose Clayborne.

Filmography

References

External links
 

1968 births
Living people
American male television actors
African-American male actors
Male actors from Cincinnati
Webster University alumni
20th-century American male actors
21st-century American male actors
20th-century African-American people
21st-century African-American people